Small Hotel is a 1957 British comedy film directed by David MacDonald and stars Gordon Harker, Marie Lohr, John Loder, and Janet Munro. It is based on the play of the same name by Rex Frost.

Premise
Albert, a crafty old waiter in a country hotel known as The Jolly Fiddler, teaches the younger staff how to maximise their tips and get rid of surplus food in the kitchen.

He suddenly finds he must work new tricks on management after being told he is too old for the job and will be replaced by a hard-nosed young waitress, named Miss Mallet.

Cast
Gordon Harker.....Albert
Marie Lohr.....Mrs. Samson-Fox
John Loder.....Mr. Finch
Irene Handl.....Mrs. Gammon
Janet Munro.....Effie Rigler
Billie Whitelaw.....Caroline Mallet
Ruth Trouncer.....Sheila
Francis Matthews.....Alan Pryor
Frederick Schiller.....Foreigner [speaking in German and then in English]
Derek Blomfield.....Roland
Dorothy Bromiley.....Rosemary

Critical reception
TV Guide gave the film two out of five stars and called it an "Average comedy"; in the Radio Times, David McGillivray also rated the film two out of five stars, calling it "no great shakes as comedy, but interesting as a vehicle built around a much-loved British star at the end of his career" whereas Britmovie noted, "Twenty years after appearing on stage in this lively Rex Frost play, in his penultimate film Gordon Harker reprises the role of a belligerent hotel waiter having to use all his wit and cunning to save his job. This low-budget film features Harker in typically jovial form, dominating comic proceedings with typical polished expertise, and with a less assured cast this thin comedy wouldn’t be worthwhile. There are early roles for Billie Whitelaw and Janet Munro, and the doughty Irene Handl is cast as the hotel’s spirited cook."

It was one of 15 films selected by Steve Chibnall and Brian McFarlane in The British 'B' Film, their survey of British B films, as among the most meritorious of the B films made in Britain between World War II and 1970. They especially praised the performances of Lohr, Handl and Harker.

References

External links

1957 films
1957 comedy films
British comedy films
Films shot at Associated British Studios
Films directed by David MacDonald (director)
British films based on plays
British black-and-white films
1950s English-language films
1950s British films